Batlim (also Romanized as Batlīm) is a village in Sajjadrud Rural District, Bandpey-ye Sharqi District, Babol County, Mazandaran Province, Iran. As of the 2006 census, its population was 57, in 13 families.

References 

Populated places in Babol County